Quadra is a municipality (município) in the state of São Paulo in Brazil. The population is 3,854 (2020 est.) in an area of 205.7 km². The elevation is 638 m.

References

Municipalities in São Paulo (state)